Homonoea is a genus of longhorn beetles of the subfamily Lamiinae, containing the following species:

subgenus Homonoea
 Homonoea albosignata Breuning, 1950
 Homonoea boudanti Hüdepohl, 1995
 Homonoea flavescens Breuning, 1958
 Homonoea ornamentalis Heller, 1926
 Homonoea pannosa Newman, 1842
 Homonoea patrona Newman, 1842
 Homonoea praecisa Newman, 1842
 Homonoea rotundipennis Breuning, 1950
 Homonoea samarana (Heller, 1924)
 Homonoea uniformis Jordan, 1894

subgenus Urocalymna
 Homonoea longimana (Westwood, 1822)

References

Homonoeini